Cynthia Girard-Renard (born 1969), also known as Cynthia Girard, is a Canadian artist.

Education
Girard-Renard earned her Bachelor of Fine Arts from Université du Québec à Montréal and her Master of Fine Arts from Goldsmiths, University of London in 1998.

Career
In 1995, Girard-Renard released a collection of poetry titled "A Disappeared Death." In 2008, she participated in a group exhibition titled "Triennale québécoise" which was displayed at Musée d'art contemporain de Montréal. The following year, her solo exhibit "Tous les oiseaux sont ici" was on display In Berlin.

In 2016, her piece " Les Sans-culottes" was on display at the Hugues Charbonneau Gallery. The series of puppets, banners and paintings was worked on by Girard-Renard during her 2015 residency and was meant to reimagine the French Revolution. She displayed a second solo exhibit at the gallery in 2018 titled "Love and Anarchy," after the film by the same name.

In 2017, her satirical painting series "Our Mad Masters" was on display at Musée d'art de Joliette. The title was derived from Jean Rouch’s anthropological film the 1995 film Les maîtres fous. While working as an artist in resident at Concordia University, her solo exhibition "La Main Invisible" was picked up at the McClure Gallery. As well, her work "No Foreigners" was on display at the National Gallery of Canada for the 2017 Canadian Biennial.

In 2018, she was one of the first recipients of the Takao Tanabe Purchase Prize in Painting for Young Artists. Later that year, she was awarded the Prix Louis-Comtois by the Association of Contemporary Art Galleries (AGAC) and the City of Montreal.

Collections
Her work is included in the collections of the National Gallery of Canada, the  Musée national des beaux-arts du Québec, and the Musée d'art contemporain de Montréal.

References

1969 births
Living people
Canadian women artists
Artists from Montreal
Academic staff of Concordia University
Université du Québec à Montréal alumni
Alumni of Goldsmiths, University of London
Canadian women poets